Yehuda Burla (born 18 September 1886, died 7 November 1969) was an Israeli author.

Biography 
Burla was born in 1886 in Jerusalem, then part of the Ottoman Empire, to a Sephardi Jewish family with rabbinical roots, originating from Izmir. As a child, he lived in the Ezrat Yisrael neighborhood near the corner of Jaffa Road and King George Street. Until the age of 18, he had a religious education, studying at yeshiva and beth midrash. After graduating from the "Ezra" teachers seminary in Jerusalem, he began working, in both a teaching and administrative capacity, in various schools affiliated to the Zionist Organization. During World War I, Burla served in the Turkish army as an interpreter, and following the war, he taught in the Hebrew school in Damascus, where he lived for five years. He continued teaching until 1944, when he started working in the public sector and was at one stage Head of the Arab Department of the Histadrut. His children were Oded Burla, a writer, poet and artist, Yair Burla, a writer and translator, Ofra Adar Burla, a writer and translator, and Zuria Ben Nun.

Awards 

 Burla was twice awarded the Bialik Prize for literature, in  1939 and 1954.
 In 1961, he was awarded the Israel Prize, for literature.

Legacy and commemoration
Yehuda Burla Street, the main thoroughfare in Jerusalem's Nayot neighborhood, was named for him.

Published works 
Lunah (Luna), 1926
Enchanted Homeland (Kismei Moledet), 1926
Without a Star (Bli Kochav), 1927 (translated into French, 1933)
His Hated Wife (Ishto Ha-Senuah), 1928
In Darkness Striving (Neftulei Adam), 1929 (translated into Arabic, 1955, and English, 1968)
Stories (Sipurim), 1929
Bat Zion (Bat Tzion), 1930
Singer (Meranenet), 1930
Na`ama (Na`amah O Ba-Nistar U-Ba-Nigleh), 1934
In Holyness or Love (Bi-Kedushah O Ahavah), 1935
The Adventures of Akaviah (Alilot Akaviah), 1939 (translated into Russian, 1980)
City Tricks (Lehatei Kiriah), 1939
Adam (Adam), 1943
On the Horizon (Ba-Ofek), 1943
At Dawn (Im Shahar), 1946
Women (Nashim), 1949
Tom and Mary (Tom Ve-Mary)
In the Circles of Love (Be-Ma`agalei Ahavah), 1953
The First Swallow (Ha-Snunit Ha-Rishonah), 1954
Yearning (Kisufim), 1955
The Journeys of Judah Halevi (Ele Masa`ei Yehuda Halevi), 1959
Rabbi Yehuda Halevi (Rav Yehuda Halevi), 1960
Sparkles (Reshafim), 1961
The Dignitary (Ba`al Be-Amav), 1962
Collected Works (Col Kitvei), 1962
Two Special Love Stories (Shnei Sipurei Ahavah Miyuhedet), 1964
Marching In (Le-Kol Ha-Tza`adah), 1965
In High Tide and in Low Tide (Be-Geut U-Be-Shefel), 1971
Collected Stories (Yalkut Sipurim), 1975
The Kingdom of David (Malchut David), 1978

See also 
Israeli literature
List of Bialik Prize recipients
List of Israel Prize recipients

References 

1886 births
1969 deaths
Israel Prize in literature recipients
Sephardi Jews in Ottoman Palestine
People from Jerusalem
Israeli Sephardi Jews
19th-century Sephardi Jews
20th-century Sephardi Jews
Israeli novelists
Israeli male short story writers
Israeli short story writers
Israeli people of Spanish-Jewish descent
20th-century novelists
20th-century short story writers
20th-century male writers
Burials at Kiryat Shaul Cemetery